
Year 471 (CDLXXI) was a common year starting on Friday (link will display the full calendar) of the Julian calendar. At the time, it was known as the Year of the Consulship of Novus and Probianus (or, less frequently, year 1224 Ab urbe condita). The denomination 471 for this year has been used since the early medieval period, when the Anno Domini calendar era became the prevalent method in Europe for naming years.

Events 
 By place 

 Roman Empire 
 Basiliscus, brother-in-law of Emperor Leo I, returns from exile (see 468) and leads an imperial conspiracy against Aspar (magister militum), helping in his murder at Constantinople. 

 Britannia 
 The army of King Ceretic of Strathclyde raids the Irish coast, carries off some of Saint Patrick's followers, and sells them into slavery (approximate date).

 Europe 
 The Visigoths under Euric conquer a large part of the Provence (Southern Gaul). The city of Clermont-Ferrand in Auvergne is besieged.
 The Goths, led by Theodoric Strabo, revolt in Thrace after the assassination of Aspar. Leo I sends Basiliscus to suppress the uprising.   
 Theodoric the Great, age 17, succeeds his father Theodemir as king of the Ostrogoths, settling his people in lower Moesia (Balkans).

 Asia 
 The ruler of the nomadic Tuoba tribal state in Northern China adopts a Chinese surname, and will rule Northern Wei as Xiao Wen Di, until his death in 499.

 By topic 
 Religion 
 Acacius becomes patriarch of Constantinople, succeeding Gennadius I.

Births

Deaths 
 August 25 – Gennadius I, patriarch of Constantinople
 Ardabur, Roman general and son of Aspar
 Aspar, Alan patrician and general (magister militum)
 Eudocia, Vandal queen and daughter of Valentinian III (approximate date) 
 Julius Patricius, Roman general and son of Aspar (approximate date)

References